Mr Don & Mr George is a Channel 4 sitcom, featuring two characters from the Scottish comedy sketch show Absolutely. Moray Hunter (Don) and Jack Docherty (George) played two unrelated characters who happened to share a surname (McDiarmid). Hunter and Docherty wrote the series and it was made by their production company, Absolutely Productions. The humour was surreal and often featured ridiculous visual gags and wordplay. A single six-episode series was made, and was first broadcast in the United Kingdom on Channel 4 in 1993.

The series was released on VHS (two tapes, each featuring three episodes) in the 1990s. A single VHS tape was released with all six episodes on as well. This tape stated that it had the entire first series on one tape; however, no further series were made.

Episodes

You Can Run.... But You Can't Hide Your Legs
Armed with a matchbox full of 34 deadly sulphur guns, Don and George set out on a deadly post-cold-war mission - to find someone to spy on.

The Winslow Apple
The police net closes in on Don, following his theft of an apple as a child. George is so tense he is in danger of exploding. A holiday not to Switzerland is the only answer.

There's Been a Thing
Don has fallen for Miss Burns the air hostess. Naturally, George tries to have his friend arrested for conspiring to go out on a date. A tale of love, jealousy and trembling lower lips.

You've Eaten My Future
Don strikes a lucrative business deal with the Ecuadorean government. One problem. Don & George don't have a business. However, they do have two hundred boxes of cornflakes, enough to build a splendid office.

No Wasps
George is going to pieces, drinking three bottles of whisky a day. Don, and a mysterious approach from Hollywood, convince George to get fit. Just in time, coincidentally, for George's boxing match with Dennis "Killer" Bowles.

This is This, Goodbye is Goodbye
Don's tenure of friendship with George expires. But Don owes money for the rental of his spectacles, so George has little option but to pawn his friend. Unfortunately, Don is purchased by two former Nazis as a large timepiece.

References
 Mr Don And Mr George videos on Absolutely website, retrieved 7 July 2006

External links
 ABsoLuTeLy Productions Ltd.
 

Scottish comedy duos
Scottish television sitcoms
1990s Scottish television series
1990s British sitcoms
1993 Scottish television series debuts
1993 Scottish television series endings
British television spin-offs
Channel 4 sitcoms
English-language television shows